José Magnani (6 March 1913 – 24 July 1966) was a Brazilian cyclist. He competed in the individual road race event at the 1936 Summer Olympics.

References

External links
 

1913 births
1966 deaths
Brazilian male cyclists
Brazilian road racing cyclists
Olympic cyclists of Brazil
Cyclists at the 1936 Summer Olympics
Sportspeople from São Paulo
Place of death missing
20th-century Brazilian people